The Original Main Street Historic District stretches for ten blocks along Main Street in downtown Sauk Centre, Minnesota, United States.  It is considered the inspiration for the 1920 novel Main Street by locally born author Sinclair Lewis, which in turn inspired the concept of "Main Street" as a symbol of American small towns.  It was listed as a historic district on the National Register of Historic Places in 1994 for its national significance in the theme of social history.  It was nominated for its close identification with the bestselling novel of the 1920s and the enduring concept it popularized.

At the time of the district's accession to the National Register, it contained 90 contributing properties and 55 non-contributing properties.  The contributing properties include the  Main Street itself and the various surviving features along its length from the period 1920 to 1947.  These include commercial and civic buildings, houses, parks, and a bridge and dam on the Sauk River.

See also
 National Register of Historic Places listings in Stearns County, Minnesota

References

External links

Buildings and structures in Stearns County, Minnesota
Historic districts on the National Register of Historic Places in Minnesota
National Register of Historic Places in Stearns County, Minnesota
Roads on the National Register of Historic Places in Minnesota
Sinclair Lewis